Andrew Peter Poppas (born ) is a United States Army general who serves as the commanding general of the United States Army Forces Command since July 8, 2022. He previously served as the director of the Joint Staff from 2020 to 2022. As director, he assisted the chairman of the Joint Chiefs of Staff in managing the Joint Staff and with the management and organization of the staff's members. He previously served as the director of operations of the Joint Staff, where he served as the principal assistant to the Chairman of the Joint Chiefs of Staff for global integration initiatives and current and future operations. Prior to that, he served as the commanding general of the 101st Airborne Division.

Poppas holds a Bachelor of Science in National Security Affairs from the United States Military Academy, a Master of Science in Occupational Education from Kansas State University and is also a graduate of the Defense Language Institute, United States Army Command and General Staff College, Senior Service College Fellowship at Harvard University and the Joint and Combined Warfighting School.

Awards and decorations

References

1966 births
Living people
American people of Greek descent
United States Military Academy alumni
United States Army Rangers
Kansas State University alumni
United States Army personnel of the Iraq War
United States Army personnel of the War in Afghanistan (2001–2021)
Recipients of the Legion of Merit
United States Army generals
Recipients of the Defense Superior Service Medal
Recipients of the Distinguished Service Medal (US Army)